Meshkanlu (also Romanized as Meshḵānlū; also known as Kalāteh-ye Mollā Moḩammad Qolī, Kalāteh Mollā Mohammad Alī, Kalāteh-ye Mollā Moḩammad ‘Alī, Kalāteh-ye Mollā Moḩammad Qoli, Meshkallū, and Kalāteh-ye Mollā Qoli) is a village in Dughayi Rural District, in the Central District of Quchan County, Razavi Khorasan Province, Iran. At the 2006 census, its population was 298, in 98 families.

References 

Populated places in Quchan County